Barima-Waini (Region 1) is a region of Guyana. Venezuela claims the territory as part of Guayana Esequiba.

The region is located in the northwest of the country and has a population of 26,941. It borders the Atlantic Ocean to the north, the region of Pomeroon-Supenaam to the east, the region of Cuyuni-Mazaruni to the south and Venezuela to the west.

Barima-Waini has three sub-regions: Mabaruma, Matakai, and Moruca.

History
Prior to the 1980 administrative reform in Guyana, the Barima-Waini Region was known as the 'North West district'.

Mabaruma became the administrative centre when it was decided that the former centre, Morawhanna, was too susceptible to flooding.

Etymology
The region is named after two rivers that flow through the region: the Barima River and the Waini River.

Geography
Barima-Waini is a heavily forested region. The Atlantic coastal strip of Region One features a number of beaches, including, from west to east, Almond Beach, Luri Beach, Shell Beach, Turtle Beach, Foxes Beach, Iron-punt Beach, Pawpaw Beach and Father's Beach.  Marine turtles nest on some of these beaches.  There are also a number of Amerindian communities in this area, including Santa Rosa Mission.

Economy
The main economic activities in the Barima-Waini region are forestry and gold mining.  The northern and northeastern sections include thousands of acres of rich alluvial soil, whose main crops include coffee, ground provisions (such as cassava, eddoes and yams), cabbage, beans, corn, peanuts, and citrus fruits. (This is the area which supplies the famous Pomeroon cassareep.)

The Matthews Ridge-Port Kaituma manganese industry was discontinued in 1968 when falling world prices made it uneconomical to continue. Mining was resumed as of 2011.

Major settlements, services and facilities
The Mabaruma sub-region includes the region's capital of Mabaruma, as well as Barabina, Hosororo, Wauna, Kumaka, White Water and Kamwatta.

Moruca sub-region includes Waramuri, Warapoka, Santa Cruz, Kokerite, Chinese Landing, Kwebena and Santa Rosa, and Haimacabra.

Matakai sub-region includes Sebai, Port Kaituma, Matthew's Ridge, Baramita, Arakaka, and Morawhanna.

The region has two secondary schools, North West Secondary School in Mabaruma, established in 1965, and Santa Rosa Secondary School, established in 1992.

Population
The Government of Guyana has administered three official censuses since the 1980 administrative reforms, in 1980, 1991 and 2002.  In 2002, the population of Barima-Waini was recorded at 24,275 people. Official census records for the population of Barima-Waini are as follows:

Communities
Communities (including name variants):

Akwero (Acquero, Aqueero)
Arakaka
Assakata
Baramani (Baramanna, Baramanni, Barimanni)
Baramita
Chinese Landing
Five Star (Five Star Landing, Five Stars)
Hobediah
Hosororo (Hossororo)
Kamwatta Hill
Kokerite (Kokerit Landing, Kokerit)
Koriabo
Kumaka
Kwebanna (Kwabanna)
Mabaruma (administrative centre)
Matthew's Ridge
Mission Landing
Morawhanna
Mount Everard
Pakera
Port Kaituma
Saint Bede's Mission (Saint Bedes)
Santa Cruz
Santa Rosa (Santa Rosa Mission)
Surprise Hill
Waramuri (Waramuri Mission)
Wauna (Wauna-Yarikita)
Whitewater

Gallery

See also

Ankoko Island
Jonestown

References

 
Regions of Guyana
States and territories established in 1980